Samir Shaker Mahmoud (born 28 February 1958) is an Iraqi former professional footballer who played as defender. He represented the Iraq national team in the 1986 FIFA World Cup. He also played for Al-Rasheed Club.

Career
Samir Shaker was one of the best central defenders during the 1980s. He started his career with Al-Jaish before moving to Salah-Al-Deen of Tikrit, who he captained the club to their first Iraqi league in 1983. After the title win, Samir and fellow team-mate Anad Abid joined the star-studded Baghdad-based club Al-Rasheed helping the club to 4 league titles, 2 cups and a record 3 Arab Championships.

In 1986, in the Arab Club Championship in Tunisia, Samir scored the solitary goal over Esperance of Tunisia helping Al Rasheed to win their second Arab title.

Shaker played for Iraq in the 1986 FIFA World Cup. In a game against Belgium Shaker spat at the referee. He received a one-year suspension never played for his country again.

In 1987, along with teammate Karim Allawi, Shaker joined Bangladeshi club Abahani Krira Chakra. He spent a year at the club, and failed to win the league title during his short stay.

He is one of the most successful coaches to manage the Bangladesh national team having led Bangladesh to the runners-up trophy in the SAFF Football Championships and to the 1999 SAF Games title in Nepal, he also coached his former club Abahani Krira Chakra and, then went onto to coach rival club Mohammedan Sporting Club of Bangladesh.

References

External links
 

Living people
1958 births
Sportspeople from Baghdad
Iraqi footballers
Iraq international footballers
Association football defenders
Al-Rasheed players
1986 FIFA World Cup players
Olympic footballers of Iraq
Footballers at the 1988 Summer Olympics
Abahani Limited (Dhaka) players
Bangladesh national football team managers
Expatriate footballers in Bangladesh
Expatriate football managers in Bangladesh